"The Americans Come (An Episode in France in the Year 1918)" is a World War I song written and composed by Fay Foster. The song was first published in 1918 by J. Fischer & Bro., in New York City. The sheet music cover depicts soldiers marching with a city and battleship on the left and a bombed city on the right.

The sheet music can be found at the Pritzker Military Museum & Library.

References 

Bibliography
Parker, Bernard S. World War I Sheet Music 1. Jefferson: McFarland & Company, Inc., 2007. . 

1918 songs
Songs of World War I
Songs about the United States
Songs about France